The Imperial Schutztruppe for German South west Africa was the official name of the military formation that maintained the German Empire in its colony of German South West Africa. The Schutztruppe are held responsible for numerous atrocities in the Herero and Nama uprising in 1904. During the First World War, the Schutztruppe was defeated by the troops of the Union of South Africa.

Formation
 acquired the bay of Angra Pequena and five miles of hinterland for the Bremen tobacconist Adolf Lüderitz on 1 May 1883 from the Nama people in Bethanie. On April 24, 1884 Bismarck telegraphed the German consul in Cape Town that " is under the protection of the German Empire".

Between October 1888 and July 1889, in the course of a dispute between the Witbooi and the Herero, there had been an expulsion of the German Commissariat and an interruption of German sovereignty in Okahandja. The German Colonial Society engaged Hauptmann Curt von François to provide security to the territory. In June 1889 he arrived with 21 soldiers, eight staff from the Imperial Army and 13 volunteers, at the British-held enclave of Walvis Bay. The formal establishment of the Schutztruppe for German South West Africa was carried out by the Reich Law of 9 June 1895. The support of these troops was the responsibility of the respective protectorates (Reich Law on the Income and Expenses of the Protected Areas of 30 March 1892, RGBl p. 369).

Structure

The Schutztruppe in German Southwest Africa was structured in 12 companies of mounted infantry totalling ca. 2,000 men in July 1914, primarily Germans. The 7th Company, stationed in the northern desert area of the colony, was mounted on imported camels. A single unit, called the Baster Company of non-local Africans was raised and deployed. Relations between the German administration and the natives in this colony had deteriorated to the point that few local Africans were recruited; however, some Boers enlisted in the Schuztruppe due to their desire to establish an sovereign Afrikaner nation independent from British control.

The colonial forces for German Southwest Africa consisted of volunteers from the imperial army and navy (including some Austrians), but essentially consisted of members of German regiments. Before their deployment to Africa these troops were prepared for their special tasks and future environment. Such a training base was at Karlsruhe. Because of the often humid conditions in the upper Rhine valley of the grand-duchy of Baden, the area provided some early acclimatization.

The structure of the Southwest African forces was as follows:
German Southwest Africa Command at Windhuk (modern Windhoek) consisted of headquarters, administration and legal (judge advocate), medical corps, surveying and mapping units.

Northern district command: Windhuk
 1st Company: Regenstein, Seeis
 4th Company: Okanjande
 6th Company: Outjo and Otavi
 2nd Battery: Johann-Albrechts-Höhe
 Transport platoon 1: Karibib
 Office for provisions: Karibib
 Horse depot: Okawayo
 Artillery and train depot: Windhuk
 Military hospital and medical depot: Windhuk
 Clothing depot: Windhuk
 Local headquarters: Windhuk
 Local headquarters and quartermaster: Swakopmund
Southern district command: Keetmanshoop
 2nd Company: Ukamas
 3rd Company: Kanus
 5th Company: Chamis and Churutabis
 7th and 8th Company (camel cavalry), military hospital: Gochas and Arahoab
 1st Battery: Narubis
 3rd Battery: Gibeon
 Transport platoon 2: Keetmanshoop
 Artillery and train depot: Keetmanshoop
 Military hospital and medical depot: Keetmanshoop
 Clothing depot: Keetmanshoop
 Office for provisions: Keetmanshoop
 Garrison administration: Keetmanshoop
 Horse depot: Aus
 Camel stud farm: Kalkfontein
 Local headquarters and quartermaster: Lüderitz

At the outbreak of World War I the force had a total strength of 91 officers, 22 physicians, 9 veterinarians, 59 civilian administrators, ammunition technicians, 342 NCOs and 1,444 German other ranks for a total of 1,967 personnel.

References

Bibliography
 
 

 
History of Namibia
German Army (German Empire)
People of former German colonies
Military history of German East Africa
German words and phrases
Colonial troops